is a Japanese track and field sprinter who specialises in the 400 metres. His personal best in the event is 45.58 seconds. He has represented Japan at several world meets including the 2017 World Championships and 2019 World Championships. He was also a reserve athlete for the Japanese 4 × 400 metres relay team at the 2015 World Championships and 2016 Olympic Games.

Personal bests

International competition

References

External links

Kentaro Sato at Fujitsu Track & Field Team 
Kentaro Sato at Tokorozawa 

1994 births
Living people
Josai University alumni
Japanese male sprinters
Sportspeople from Saitama Prefecture
Olympic athletes of Japan
Athletes (track and field) at the 2016 Summer Olympics
World Athletics Championships athletes for Japan
Universiade silver medalists in athletics (track and field)
Universiade silver medalists for Japan
People from Tokorozawa, Saitama
Athletes (track and field) at the 2020 Summer Olympics
21st-century Japanese people